Flute Fraternity (also released as Hi-Flutin') is an album by multi-instrumentalists Herbie Mann and Buddy Collette recorded at sessions in 1957 and released on the Mode label.

Reception

The Allmusic review by Scott Yanow states: "The most interesting aspect to this lightly swinging music is the constant switching around of the lead voices on their various horns", although The Penguin Guide to Jazz Recordings criticises the album for the number of different combinations of instruments used.

Track listing
All compositions by Herbie Mann except where noted.
 "Herbie's Buddy" - 4:08
 "Perdido" (Juan Tizol, Ervin Drake, Hans Lengsfelder) - 4:13
 "Baubles, Bangles, & Beads" (Robert Wright, George Forrest) - 4:20
 "Give a Little Whistle" (Leigh Harline, Ned Washington) - 3:35
 "Here's Pete" (Pete Rugolo) - 2:40
 "Theme from "Theme From"" - 6:44
 "Nancy (with the Laughing Face)" (Jimmy Van Heusen, Phil Silvers) - 3:57
 "Morning After" - 2:38

Personnel
Herbie Mann - flute, alto flute, clarinet, tenor saxophone
Buddy Collette - flute, alto flute, clarinet, alto saxophone, tenor saxophone
Jimmy Rowles - piano, celesta
Buddy Clark - bass
Mel Lewis - drums

References

Herbie Mann albums
Buddy Collette albums
1957 albums